The St. Thomas beaked snake (Letheobia feae) is a species of snake in the family Typhlopidae. The species is native to the Gulf of Guinea off the western coast of Central Africa.

Etymology
The specific name, feae, is in honor of Leonardo Fea, who was an Italian explorer and naturalist.

Geographic range
L. feae is found on the island of São Tomé in the nation of São Tomé and Príncipe.

Habitat

Behavior
L. feae is terrestrial and fossorial.

Reproduction
L. feae is oviparous.

References

Further reading
Boulenger GA (1906). "Report on the reptiles collected by the late L. Fea in West Africa". Annali del Museo Civico di Storia Naturale di Genova, Third Series 2: 196–216. (Typhlops feae, new species, p. 209, Figure 5; Typhlops principis, new species, pp. 209–210, Figure 6).
Broadley DG, Wallach V (2007). "A review of East and Central African species of Letheobia Cope, revived from the synonymy of Rhinotyphlops Fitzinger, with descriptions of five new species (Serpentes: Typhlopidae)". Zootaxa 1515: 31–68. (Letheobia feae, new combination).
Chippaux J-P, Jackson K (2019). Snakes of Central and Western Africa. Baltimore: Johns Hopkins University Press. 448 pp. .
Roux-Estève R (1974). "Révision systématique des Typhlopidae d'Afrique, Reptilia-Serpentes ". Mémoires du Muséum National d'Histoire Naturelle Nouvelle Serie - Serie A, Zoologie 87: 1–313. (Rhinotyphlops feae, new combination, p. 202). (in French).

Letheobia
Endemic fauna of São Tomé Island
Reptiles described in 1906